Zhao Rukuo (1170–1231), also romanised as Zhao Rugua, Chau Ju-kua, or misread as Zhao Rushi, was a Chinese historian and politician during the Song dynasty. He wrote a two-volume book titled Zhu Fan Zhi. The book deals with the world known to the Chinese in the twelfth and thirteenth centuries; the first volume is a list of foreign places with descriptions of each place and the customs of its local people. The second volume is a catalog of trade goods.

Biography
Zhao was a member of the Song Dynasty imperial clan, an eighth-generation descendant of Emperor Taizong in the lineage through the younger brother of Emperor Zhenzong.

He was born in Tiantai County in Taizhou, Zhejiang in 1170. He began his career as a bureaucrat in 1190, and rose through the rank.  In 1224, he was appointed the supervisor of maritime trade (市舶司) in Quanzhou, Fujian province.  He also held the posts of prefect for Quanzhou as well the southern administrator.  He died in 1231 and was buried in Linhai County in Zhejiang.

Zhu Fan Zhi

While working in Fujian, Zhao noted the commodities from various countries, and he had the opportunity to meet foreign merchants from whom he gathered information on various countries around the world.  He also studied maps, and with the information that he collected, he wrote the book, which he finished around 1225. Many entries of Zhu Fan Zhi take information from an older work from 1178, Lingwai Daida by another geographer, Zhou Qufei. However, a significant part of the book came from what he gathered from foreign and Chinese traders.

Although Zhao had not travelled outside of China, the book contained valuable information on various countries in the 13th century for modern scholars. The countries ranged from those nearby such as Japan, to the various kingdoms in South East Asia, such as Srivijaya and Brunei, places in India, to the Islamic heartland of Arabia and Mecca, as well as countries in Africa, and as far as southern Spain.

See also 
Friedrich Hirth

Notes

References 

1170 births
1231 deaths
13th-century Chinese historians
Historians from Zhejiang
History of Kerala
Politicians from Taizhou, Zhejiang
Song dynasty historians
Song dynasty politicians from Zhejiang
Writers from Taizhou, Zhejiang